Unmade Beds is a 2009 British comedy-drama film directed Alexis Dos Santos and starring Fernando Tielve, Déborah François, Michiel Huisman, Iddo Goldberg, Richard Lintern and Katia Winter. The film was featured at the 2009 Sundance Film Festival and at Febiofest 2010.

Plot
The film tells the story of a couple of young people trying to deal with their life problems. A 20-year-old boy from Spain, Axl, travels to London to find his father who left during his childhood and who Axl doesn't remember anything about. A Belgian girl, Vera, came to London to overcome a recent breakup. They both try alcohol, random sex encounters, dancing, and music, but neither of them finds what they are looking for - until one day they meet and are then ready to move on with their lives.

Cast
 Fernando Tielve as Axl
 Déborah François as Vera
 Michiel Huisman as X Ray Man
 Iddo Goldberg as Mike
 Richard Lintern as Anthony Hemmings
 Katia Winter as Hannah
 Alexis Dos Santos as Alejo
 Lucy Tillett as Lucy
 Al Weaver as Kevin

Production
The film uses quick razor cuts with blurred background and various sound changes to deliver the natural experience of the environment and the feeling of people involved.

Accolades
 2009: Nominated for Grand Jury Prize - World Cinema / Dramatic during Sundance Film Festival
 2009: Won Crystal Arrow at Les Arcs European Film Festival
 2009: Won Quebec Film Critics Award / Special Mention at Montréal Festival of New Cinema

References

External links
 
 
 

2009 films
2009 comedy-drama films
British comedy-drama films
2000s English-language films
2000s French-language films
2000s Spanish-language films
2000s Italian-language films
Films set in London
2009 multilingual films
British multilingual films
2000s British films